Gazetteer of the Bombay Presidency is a publication of the erstwhile British India first published in the year 1884 and printed at the Government Central Press, Bombay (now Mumbai) in 1884. Since the early 19th Century the English East India Company and later the British Empire annexed most of Western India and collectively named the provinces in Western India as Bombay Presidency.

Most of these texts are now available free to read online as scanned books (see External Links).

Each volume in the publications consists of the historic, geographic and demographic information of the numerous British and princely states under the presidency. The general editor of the first edition was James Macnabb Campbell.

Volumes

Part I
Part I consists of
 History of Gujarat
 History of other minor states - Sholapur, Belgaum, etc.

Part II
Part II consists of five books, namely;

 Book I - History of The Konkan, By The Reverend Alexander Kyd Nairne.
 Book II -  Early History Of The Dakhan down to the Mahomedan Conquest, By Professor Ramkrishna Gopal Bhandarkar
 Book III - The Dynasties of the Kanarese Districts of The Bombay Presidency from the earliest historical times to the Musalman Conquest, By John Faithfull Fleet
 Book IV - Dakhan History, Musalman and Maratha, AD 1300–1818, Part I-Poona Satara and Sholapur, Part II-Khandesh Nashik and Ahmadnagar, By W.W.Loch
 Book V - History of the Bombay Karnataka, Musalman and Maratha, A.D 1300–1818, Colonel E.W.West

References

External links

 

Indian inscriptions
Bombay Presidency
1884 non-fiction books
1896 non-fiction books
19th-century Indian books
Gazetteers of India